The Metro Manila Film Festival (MMFF) is an annual film festival held in Metro Manila, Philippines. The festival, which runs from December 25 (Christmas) through New Year's Day and into first weekend of January in the following year, focuses on Filipino films.  During the course of the festival, movie theaters show only films that are approved by its jurors and exclude foreign films except in 3D theaters and IMAX theaters. Since 2010s, film entries were played in select 3D cinemas that it can show movies in 2D format. It is one of the two Filipino major film festivals to exclude movies out of the country in a week-long period, the other being the Pista ng Pelikulang Pilipino happening during August.

The annual event began with the 1975 Metro Manila Film Festival, during which Diligin Mo ng Hamog ang Uhaw na Lupa ("Water the Thirsty Earth with Dew") by Augusto Buenaventura won the best film award.

One of the festival highlights is the parade of floats at the opening of the festival. The floats, each one representing a movie entry with their respective stars, parade down usually Roxas Boulevard, as was the case in many of the previous awards. Beginning in 2017, however, the float parade is now usually hosted by each of the 17 local governments of the capital region. On the awards night, a Best Float award is also announced along with the major acting awards.

A sister festival which is a spin-off of the MMFF, the Metro Manila Summer Film Festival, was supposed to have its first edition in April 2020. but  was canceled due to the COVID-19 pandemic. The sister festival will be launched by April 2023.

History

A precursor the current festival began in 1966.  Then-mayor of Manila Antonio Villegas inaugurated the "Manila Film Festival" ("Manila Tagalog Film Festival"). It was set up in order to get Philippine films screened in "first-run" theaters which at that time only screened American films.  It was a 12-day event from June 14 through June 24, Manila's birthday, during which only locally produced films could be shown in the theatres. The festival featured a parade in downtown Manila of actors and the featured films. In addition, in an effort to promote Philippine films, Antonio Villegas banned the showing of foreign films at movie houses during the Manila Film Festival. Most of the first batch of the festival films came up with English titles. Despite the lack of support, there were different changes in making the festival flourish.

The best films of Manila Film Festival included Daigdig ng mga Api (1966), Dahil sa Isang Bulaklak (1967), Manila, Open City (1968), Patria Adorada (1969), Dimasalang (1970), Cadena de Amor (1971), Elias, Basilio at Sisa (1972), Nueva Vizcaya (1973) and Alaala mo Daigdig Ko (1974). Starting in 1975, Manila Film Festival was discontinued as Metro Manila Film Festival took over.

In 1973, the Manila Film Festival was discontinued as Martial Law was imposed in September the year before. On September 21, 1975, during the Marcos Presidency, the filmfest was expanded to include all the other cities and towns in the newly formed Metro Manila and began under the name "1975 Metropolitan Film Festival" (MFF). In 1977, name was changed to "Metro Manila Film Festival".

After Villegas' death in 1984, a special award in the Metro Manila Film Festival, the Gatpuno Antonio J. Villegas Cultural Award, was created in his honor and is given to the best film that best portrays Philippine culture and Filipino people to the world. MRN Film International's Andrea, Paano Ba ang Maging Isang Ina? was the first one to receive the lifetime achievement award in 1990. Since then, it has been awarding prestigious films that deserves the honors.

In 2010, the film festival underwent some changes. First, the commercial viability criterion (box-office performance of the entries) was removed. As of 2010, the criteria for the selection of Best Picture(s) are: artistry; creativity and technical excellence; innovation; and thematic value. Entries are also judged for global appeal (70 percent) and Filipino cultural and/or historical value (30 percent). In addition, the festival format gave a tribute to independent "indie" films. Lastly, the established board of jurors was expanded to include housewives, drivers, students, teachers, etc. The festival logo was changed to feature a map of the Metropolis of Manila, based on the old seal of the Metropolitan Manila Development Authority with seventeen stars on it symbolizing the 17 cities and municipality of Metro Manila. The logo for the first 35 festivals featured a torch.

In September 2011, Atty. Francis Tolentino, then-chairman of the Metropolitan Manila Development Authority (MMDA) changed the category name of "indie" films to "New Wave" films to make it sound better and more attractive to hear, as well as including "Student Short Film Category" for the first time. Consequently, the next year, the 38th Metro Manila Film Festival held in 2012 became the highest earning MMFF to date with 767 million pesos, 21% higher than that of 2011.

In January 2013 Interaksyon.com review, writer Jessica Zafra complained, "Speaking of standards, why do we bother to review the festival entries when most of them are rubbish? Because they're not supposed to be rubbish! Contrary to what you’ve been led to believe, 'entertainment' and 'commercial appeal' are not synonyms for 'garbage'. There are good commercial movies, and there are bad commercial movies. The bad outnumber the good because the studios think the viewers are idiots."

Notable incidents

There have been numerous notable incidents during the various festivals.

In 1977, director Lino Brocka walked out of the awarding ceremonies at the Metropolitan Theater when Celso Ad. Castillo's Burlesk Queen starring Vilma Santos won eight of the ten awards including the Best Picture award during the 3rd Metro Manila Film Festival. Mr. Brocka reportedly threw invectives at Rolando Tinio, who was the chairman of the panel of judges of the festival.

In 1978, the board of jurors decided to not award honors for Best Actor, Best Actress, Best Supporting Actor and Best Supporting Actress on the 4th Metro Manila Film Festival. Instead, the jurors gave Nora Aunor a "Best Performer" award for her role in the movie Atsay. Aunor beat Vilma Santos, whom fortune-tellers on the talk show of Inday Badiday and many moviegoers predicted would win the award for her role in the movie Rubia Servios. When Nora accepted her award, she cried "Mama, mali ang hula nila" ("Mama, their prediction is wrong") apparently because fortune-tellers incorrectly predicted the outcome.

In 1983, during the awards night of the 9th Metro Manila Film Festival, many were surprised after Coney Reyes won the Best Actress award for the movie Bago Kumalat ang Dugo and Anthony Alonzo is given the Best Actor award for the same movie, besting acting greats Charito Solis, Phillip Salvador, and Vic Silayan, who were all in the movie Karnal. In addition, juror's standards of giving Willie Milan the Best Director award against Lino Brocka is questioned.

In 1986, for the first time, the 12th Metro Manila Film Festival did not give out the traditional first and second Best Picture awards as well as the other two categories: Best Story and Best Screenplay. According to one of the jurors, Tingting Cojuangco stated: "No one of the seven entries deserved these awards..." She added that they: "...would like to express [their] concern over the current state of the Philippine movie industry as reflected in the entries to the year's MMFF...[The entries] failed to reinforce and inculcate positive Filipino values by portraying negative stereotypes, imitating foreign films and perpetuating commercially-oriented movies...".

In 1988 during the award-giving ceremony of the 14th Metro Manila Film Festival, stuntman and character actor-turned-filmmaker Baldo Marro won the Best Actor for Patrolman film, which also won him the Best Director award. In fact, he was not known before this. He bested prizewinning director Chito Roño of Itanong Mo Sa Buwan in the division, sending uproar from well-meaning critics and regular local film observers. Nevertheless, the announced Best Director award goes to Laurice Guillen.

In 1993, during the "Gabi ng Parangal" of the 1993 Metro Manila Film Festival, the list of winners was supposedly leaked.

In 1994, during the "Gabi ng Parangal" of 20th Metro Manila Film Festival held in PICC, the six major awards (Three Best Pictures, Gatpuno Antonio J. Villegas Cultural Awards, Best Director, and Best Screenplay) were not given as Alejandro Roces, chairman of the Board of Jurors announced that "none of the entries was deserving". On the side note, the Manila Film Fest (MFF) had a similar, but different case in which both the Best Actress and Best Actor awards were given to Ruffa Gutierrez and Gabby Concepcion respectively instead of the supposed-to-be winners.

In 2001, on December 27 of the 27th Metro Manila Film Festival, Cesar Montano, although he received the Best Actor award, expressed his disappointment that his film, Bagong Buwan did not receive the Best Picture award. He states: "For me, Bagong Buwan is still the best picture. No offense meant, but for others, Yamashita may be the best picture. Kanya-kanya 'yan. Wala nga lang kaming trophy. Bibili na lang kami ng trophy sa Recto. (To each his own. We just don't have a trophy. We'll just buy one in Recto)." referring to a strip on C.M. Recto Avenue in Manila notorious for manufacturing fake diplomas, certificates and trophies.

In 2002, first, the cast of the film Dekada '70 walked out of the award ceremonies after Lualhati Bautista failed to win the Best Story and Best Screenplay awards. Even more controversial was the decision of the judges to name the first-timer Ara Mina the Best Actress for her role in Mano Po, beating multi-awarded Vilma Santos, who was in Dekada '70. In addition, the producers of the films Spirit Warriors: The Shortcut and Lastikman protested the non-inclusion of the two films as official entries, prompting the Metro Manila Film Festival committee to extend the annual event. Consequently, the committee extended the film screenings to seven days to accommodate two more films which did not make it to the entries.

Speaking of the films, Chito Roño, director of Second Best Picture Dekada '70, was curious as to why was Spirit Warriors: The Shortcut named the Third Best Picture award if the officials disqualify it as an official entry. In the same way, the production team of Ang Agimat: Antin-Anting ni Lolo was also appalled to the decision of the jurors to give the Best Visual Effects award to Spirit Warriors: The Shortcut if they only use "mono", beating their use of the more advanced "Dolby Digital system".

In 2005, director Joel Lamangan walked out after he lost to Jose Javier Reyes. Lamangan failed to win the Best Director for Blue Moon against Reyes' Kutob. In the same year, Regal Films's matriarch Lily Monteverde voiced out her disappointment as she lamented that some winners in the festival were "undeserving".

In 2006, Octoarts Films and M-Zet Production's Enteng Kabisote 3: Okay Ka, Fairy Ko: The Legend Goes On and On and On was declared the Best Picture after festival organizers changed the criteria for the award by giving more weight to "commercial appeal". As it was the only prize that the film won, the decision to let the film receive it becomes the subject of yet another controversy at the festival. Movie producer Star Cinema made a protest to the MMDA and wrote to then MMFF chairman Bayani Fernando, claiming that the movie Kasal, Kasali, Kasalo should have won Best Picture because it topped the box office for the first few days.

In 2007, the awards night ended in less than an hour after festival organizers decided to just announce the winners without even mentioning the nominees for each category. The organizers explained that it had to be rushed and had to end at exactly 9pm because a concert, featuring singer Lani Misalucha, was scheduled right after the awards ceremonies.

In 2011, Amable "Tikoy" Aguiluz declined to accept the award for Best Director for the movie Manila Kingpin after he claimed that the movie "was edited without his consent beyond his recognition."

In 2014, Rina Navarro, one of the producers of Bonifacio: Ang Unang Pangulo questioned the result of the panel's judgement in the awards night. The movie won the most coveted Best Picture award but it failed to win the other major categories such as the Best Director award, the Best Actor and Best Actress awards, the Best Screenplay award, and the Best Original Story award all of which went to Dan Villegas' English Only, Please.

In 2015, a day before the awards night, Erik Matti's Honor Thy Father was disqualified for the Best Picture award after being screened at the Cinema One Originals. Dondon Monteverde, the film's producer, revealed that they did disclose this information beforehand. He attested that its premiere at the Cinema One festival didn't generate revenue which complies by the rules. He also questioned the timing of this decision, one day before the awards ceremony, and he demanded an investigation.

In 2016, the festival gained buzz after the EXECOM {Executive Committee} announced the top 8 entries for the 2016 edition. Different from past years, the movies of the certified box-office drawers Vice Ganda & Coco Martin's The Super Parental Guardians, Vic Sotto's Enteng Kabisote 10 and the Abangers, Regal Entertainment's Mano Po 7: Tsinoy and Vhong Navarro's Mang Kepweng Returns was rejected in that edition. But despite good reviews about the 8 entries, the film festival only grossed , or a  drop from 2015 Metro Manila Film Festival's . And the edition of the festival showed only Indie films. The idea of indie-only film was later scrapped and commercial films was allowed again.

Scope

As the name suggest, the Metro Manila Film Festival ran by the Metropolitan Manila Development Authority covers cinemas within Metro Manila. The initial allocation of cinema slots for the film festival's entry films are determined through lottery. This allocation system had only been applied for cinemas in Metro Manila in the past, but this now utilized for cinemas outside the metropolis as well. However cinemas are free to drop or continue to screen certain entry films after the first day. Cinemas outside Metro Manila are also free to screen non-entries, as was the case during the run of the 2016 edition, where non-entry mainstream films The Super Parental Guardians and Enteng Kabisote 10 and the Abangers were screened by select provincial theaters during the festival's run.

Festivals

Awards

The Gabi ng Parangal serves as the awarding ceremony for participating films in the Metro Manila Film Festival.

Merit categories

Festival awards

Special awards

Other awards

Short film categories
 Best Short Film: since 2016
 Special Jury Prize: since 2016
 Best Director: since 2016
 Best Screenplay: since 2016

Defunct New Wave categories
 Best Full-Length Film: 2010–2015
 Best Actress: 2011–2015
 Best Actor: 2011–2015
 Best Director: 2012–2015
 Gender Sensitivity Award: 2011–2015
 Special Jury Prize: 2011–2015
 Best Student Film: 2011–2015
 New Wave Animation Best Picture: 2011–2015

Most received wins
This is a list of superlative Metro Manila Film Festival winners. This list is current as of the 2021 Metro Manila Film Festival "Gabi ng Parangal" (awards ceremony) held on December 27, 2021.

The following are fifteen films which have received ten or more awards in different categories.

Best Director

Best Actor

Best Actress

Best Supporting Actor

Best Supporting Actress

Most combined wins
Most combined awards for Best Actor, Best Supporting Actor, and Best Director.

Most combined awards for Best Actress and Best Supporting Actress.

Highest-grossing entries
The table shows the highest-grossing Filipino film entries in the Metro Manila Film Festival that hits the hundred million mark.

Note: All figures are in Philippine Peso.

Notes

References

External links
IMDB: Metro Manila Film Festival
 Official website of the Metro Manila Film Festival

 
 
Philippine film awards
Film festivals in the Philippines
Festivals in Metro Manila
1966 establishments in the Philippines
Metropolitan Manila Development Authority